Heartland or Heartlands may refer to:

Businesses and organisations 

 Heartland Bank, a New Zealand-based financial institution
 Heartland Inn, a chain of hotels based in Iowa, United States
 Heartland Alliance, an anti-poverty organization in Chicago, Illinois, U.S.
 The Heartland Institute, a libertarian thinktank based in Chicago, Illinois, U.S.

Film and television
 Heartland (film), a 1979 film starring Rip Torn and Conchata Ferrell
 Heartland (1989 film), a UK television film featuring Jane Horrocks
 Heartlands (film), a 2002 film starring Michael Sheen and Celia Imrie
 Heartland (1989 TV series), an American comedy series starring Brian Keith
 Heartland (Australian TV series), a 1994 television series starring Cate Blanchett
 Heartland (Canadian TV series), a 2007 drama series
 Heartland (2007 American TV series), a medical drama series
 Heartland (TV network), an American country music & lifestyle-focused television network
 Heartland with John Kasich, an American political television show
 The Heartland Series, a production of WBIR-TV in Tennessee
 TVNZ Heartland, a Sky Digital T.V. channel that featured reruns of classic New Zealand made television shows

Literature 
 Heartland (1999 novel), a novel by Daren Shiau set in Singapore
 Heartland (novel series),  an equestrian, young-adult series by Lauren Brooke
 Heartland (comics), a comic book series by Garth Ennis and Steve Dillon
 Heartland (nonfiction book), a 2018 memoir by Sarah Smarsh
 Heartland, a 2009 football-themed novel by Anthony Cartwright (writer)
 Heartland, a 1964 novel by Wilson Harris
 Heartland, a 2004 novel by John MacKay

Music 
 Heartland rock, a late-1970s and 1980s genre of rock music
 Heartland (band), an American country music band

Albums 
 Heartland (Client album) (2007)
 Heartland (The Judds album) (1987)
 Heartland (Nelly album) (2021)
 Heartland (Owen Pallett album) (2010)
 Heartland (Real Life album) (1983)
 Heartland (Runrig album) (1985)
 Heartlands (Kate Rusby album) (2003)
 Heartland (Michael Stanley Band album) (1979)
 Heartland, a 2017 album by John Tibbs

Songs 
 "Heartland" (George Strait song)
 "Heartland" (U2 song) (1988)
 "Heartland", a song by Celtic Thunder
 "Heartland", a song by the Sisters of Mercy from Some Girls Wander by Mistake
 "Heartland", a song by the Sound from Jeopardy

Places 

 Heartland (United States), a central U.S. cultural region
 Heartland, Texas, U.S.
 Heartlands Cornwall, a mining attraction in Pool, England
 Heartland of America Park, Omaha, Nebraska, U.S.
 Heartland Village, Staten Island, New York City, U.S.

Schools 
 Heartlands Academy, Birmingham, England
 Heartland Community College, Illinois, U.S.
 Heartland Elementary School, Kansas, U.S.
 Heartland Baptist Bible College, Oklahoma, U.S.

Sports
 Heartland Championship, a New Zealand rugby union competition
 Heartland Collegiate Athletic Conference, an American N.C.A.A. league in Division III
 Heartland Conference, a defunct American N.C.A.A. league in Division II
 Heartland F.C., a Nigerian association football club
 Heartland League, a defunct American baseball league
 Heartland Trophy, an American-football award for Iowa–Wisconsin games

Other uses
 Heartland (video game), 1986

See also
 Hartland (disambiguation)

 Heartland Theory in geopolitics
 Heartlanders, a 2002 Singaporean television series
 List of institutions and events with Heartland in their name